was a town located in Ogasa District, Shizuoka Prefecture, Japan.

Daitō Town was created in 1973 through the merger of Ohama Town with Joto Village.

As of April 2004, the town had an estimated population of 20,937 and a population density of 453.86 persons per km². The total area was 46.13 km². The main agricultural products were green tea, melons, strawberries and sake.

On April 1, 2005, Daitō, along with the town of Ōsuka (also from Ogasa District), was merged into the expanded city of Kakegawa.

External links
 Kakegawa official website 

Dissolved municipalities of Shizuoka Prefecture
Kakegawa, Shizuoka